PICMG 1.3 is a PICMG specification which is commonly referred to as SHB Express.  SHB Express is a modernization of PICMG 1.0 single-board computer specification. SHB Express, or System Host Board – Express, uses the same physical form factor as PICMG 1.0 boards. The board-to-backplane interfaces are PCI Express instead of PCI and ISA, although the use of PCI remains as an option.

Key Features
 PCI Express: 20 PCI Express lanes including x16, x8, x4 and x1 PCI Express configuration are supported.
 PCI optional supported: 32Bit PCI Bus with up to 4 Master-capable Slots at the Backplane and with 33 MHz or optional 66 MHz. PCI-X Capabilities are also optional supported.
 additional I/O: up to 4 USB Connections, up to 2 SATA and up to 2 Ethernet (GBit) are also optional supported to the Backplane.

PICMG Status
Adopted : 8/20/2005

Current Revision : 1.0

External links
 PICMG's 1.3 Overview

References

Open standards
PICMG standards